Kaido Kalm (born March 24, 1965) is an Estonian ice sledge hockey player.

He was part of the Estonian sledge hockey team at the 1998 Winter Paralympics in Nagano (4th place) and at the 2002 Winter Paralympics in Salt Lake City (6th place).

References

External links
 

1965 births
Amputee category Paralympic competitors
Estonian sledge hockey players
Ice sledge hockey players at the 1998 Winter Paralympics
Ice sledge hockey players at the 2002 Winter Paralympics
Living people
Paralympic sledge hockey players of Estonia